The Teatro Rojas is a theater in the city of Toledo (Castile-La Mancha, Spain). It was inaugurated in 1879 on the old corral de comedias called Mesón de la Fruta and in its construction participated several architects. It is denominated like this in honor of the Toledan playwright Francisco de Rojas.

Construction 
The author of the first project of building of the theater was the municipal architect Luis Antonio Fenech, who presented in the city council the drawings and the corresponding memory in 1866, year in which begins to dismantle the coliseum that was to the previous corral de comedias, the Mesón de la Fruta. Soon after, due to the death of Fenech, was named municipal architect Ramiro Amador de los Ríos, son of José Amador de los Ríos, that had to take charge immediately of the definitive demolition of the previous theater.

Starting from the plant already set by Fenech and on the idea of showing the square the main façade and leaving for the long axis of the site the development of the hall and the stage, Amador de los Ríos introduced some novelties. He multiplied the stairs, improved the layout of the hall, giving it a more open horseshoe, graduated the flight and the layout of the different floors and favored the ventilation through the ceiling of the hall.

Ramiro Amador de los Ríos was succeeded in a few years by three more architects, although they did not change the current project.

The theater was inaugurated on October 19, 1879, with the depiction of the work of Francisco de Rojas, the drama of honor Del Rey abajo ninguno.

Interior 
In the paintings of the ceiling these appear Thalia, the muse of the theatre, and a series of medallions in which we see great authors of the Theatre in Spain, like Tirso de Molina, Calderón de la Barca or Francisco de Rojas, that gives name to the theater.

The parapets of the box, the narrow columns of iron, the opening of the stage with the boxes of the proscenium and, finally, the spectacular curtain of the mouth, make of this room an important piece within the particular panorama of the Spanish municipal theater of 19th century.

References 
This article is a derivative of the provision relating to the process of declaration or initiation of a Property of Cultural Interest published in Official Gazette No. 275 on November 14, 1996 (text), which is free of known restrictions under the law of author in accordance with the provisions of article 13 of the Spanish Intellectual Property Law.

Theatres in Castilla–La Mancha
Bien de Interés Cultural landmarks in the Province of Toledo
Buildings and structures in Toledo, Spain
Theatres completed in 1879